Sir George Matthew Fowlds  (15 September 1860 – 17 August 1934) was a New Zealand politician of the Liberal Party.

Biography

Early life and career
Fowlds was born in Fenwick, East Ayrshire, Scotland. His father, Matthew Fowlds, was a handloom weaver and was the last surviving member of the Fenwick Weavers' Society. He lived to be 101 years old. As a boy, George Fowlds weaved linen sheets. He attended Hairshaw School in Waterside. He did his apprenticeship at a clothier in Kilmarnock, and later worked in Glasgow, where he attended night classes at Anderson's College. After completing his studies in commerce he worked several jobs as a general labourer, fencer, carpenter and painter before deciding to leave Scotland.

Fowlds emigrated to South Africa in 1882 and lived in Cape Town, Beaufort West, and Bultfontein. In 1884, he married Mary Ann Fulton, who was also from Fenwick. In the following year, they moved to Auckland, New Zealand, as the South African climate was detrimental to his wife's health. He built up a business as a clothier in Victoria Street. In New Zealand he became involved in community affairs becoming a prominent Freemason, Rotarian, member of the Workers' Educational Association (WEA) and was chairman of the Congregational Union of New Zealand.

Member of Parliament

Fowlds represented the City of Auckland electorate from 1899 to 1902, and then the Grey Lynn electorate from 1902 to 1911. In 1890, Fowlds moved his family to Mount Albert, to a large country house known as Greystone Knowe.

He was a firm believer in a single tax and was by extension the president of the New Zealand Land Values League, a Georgist group dedicated to implementing a land value tax. In 1905 Fowlds decided to return to Scotland for his father's 100th birthday. He decided he needed a New Zealand passport when his ship was about to leave, though they were not then usually required for overseas travel; an inconvenience to the department, and to the Governor who then personally signed each New Zealand passport.

Though critical of some of the policies of Premier Richard Seddon, Fowlds did not support the New Liberal Party in 1905.  He was "in favour of the referendum and an elective Executive". He immediately earned a reputation as a left-wing among Liberals and was kept out of the cabinet by Seddon, who though he would have made a good minister but for his belief in the single tax.

Seddon's successor, Sir Joseph Ward, appointed Fowlds to the cabinet on condition he hold in abeyance some of his more radical views. He was appointed Minister of Education and Minister of Public Health in 1906 before dropping the health portfolio in 1909 when he was instead designated Minister of Customs and Minister of Immigration.

Independent Liberal
He resigned from Cabinet in September 1911 over the single tax issue. He stayed in Parliament so he could remain a private member until there was "a truly democratic party in a position to form a government". His resignation from the ministry was seen as a contributing factor to the fall of the Liberal government in 1912. In 1911, Fowlds introduced the Proportional Representation And Effective Voting Bill (86–1). However, this bill failed to be passed into law.

Fowlds stood as an Independent Liberal Labour candidate for Grey Lynn in the 1911 election. He then became involved in the task of creating a moderate Labour Party in New Zealand and was a high-profile attendee of the Labour Unity Conferences. He joined the United Labour Party (ULP) and was chairman of the Auckland ULP from 1912 to 1913. At the next election in 1914 he contested Grey Lynn again as the ULP candidate. But, in 1919, he was again a Liberal. After his third consecutive defeat he withdrew from politics and devoted himself to education governance.

Later life and death
Fowlds then became president of Auckland University College. He was the first chairman of Massey Agricultural College from 1927 to 1934.

He died on 17 August 1934 at Auckland and was survived by his wife.

Awards and legacy
Fowlds was made a Commander of the Order of the British Empire in 1919, and appointed a Knight Bachelor, for public services, in the 1928 King's Birthday Honours.

The personal papers of Sir George Fowlds are housed in Special Collections at the University of Auckland Library.  The extensive collection covers political, personal, business and social matters and includes letters, newspaper clippings, speech drafts, articles, sermons, accounts books, photographs and cartoons.

Fowlds Park was named after him in 1933.

Further reading

Works of Fowlds

This is reprinted from the Auckland Star of 3 June 1910.

Works about Fowlds

This is reprinted from the N.Z. Town and Country Life of 25 June 1913.

This is reprinted from the New Zealand draper of 30 November 1921.

 This is a version of an undated M.A. thesis from the University of Auckland.

Notes

References

External links
 

1860 births
1934 deaths
New Zealand Knights Bachelor
New Zealand Commanders of the Order of the British Empire
New Zealand Liberal Party MPs
Independent MPs of New Zealand
New Zealand Labour Party (1910) politicians
United Labour Party (New Zealand) politicians
Members of the Cabinet of New Zealand
New Zealand Congregationalists
Scottish emigrants to New Zealand
People from East Ayrshire
New Zealand education ministers
Members of the New Zealand House of Representatives
New Zealand MPs for Auckland electorates
Unsuccessful candidates in the 1896 New Zealand general election
Unsuccessful candidates in the 1911 New Zealand general election
Unsuccessful candidates in the 1914 New Zealand general election
Unsuccessful candidates in the 1919 New Zealand general election
Scottish emigrants to South Africa
Chancellors of Massey University
19th-century New Zealand politicians
New Zealand politicians awarded knighthoods